English singer Rita Ora has released two studio albums, two extended plays, 21 singles as a lead artist, seven singles as a featured artist and six promotional singles. Four of Ora's singles have reached number one on the UK Singles Chart, while 13 of her singles have reached the top 10, making Ora the British female artist with the most top 10 entries in the ranking. In February 2012, Ora was featured on English producer DJ Fresh's single "Hot Right Now", which entered the top 50 in several countries. Her debut studio album, Ora, was released by Columbia, Ministry of Sound and Roc Nation in August 2012. The album reached number one on the UK Albums Chart and has since been certified platinum by the British Phonographic Industry (BPI). It reached the top 30 in Australia, Ireland, New Zealand and Scotland. Of the four singles from the album, "How We Do (Party)" (2012) and "R.I.P." (2012) reached number one on the UK Singles Chart, while "Shine Ya Light" (2012) and "Radioactive" (2013) reached the top 10 and top 20 on the chart, respectively.

Ora's second studio album, Phoenix, was distributed by Atlantic in November 2018. The album peaked at number 11 on the UK Albums Chart and attained a gold certification in the UK. Elsewhere, it entered the album charts, among others, in Austria, Canada, Germany, Italy and the United States. Five singles preceded the album, "Your Song" (2017), "Anywhere" (2017), "For You" (2018), "Let You Love Me" (2018) and "Only Want You" (2018), with four of them reaching the top 10 on the UK Singles Chart. In February 2021, Ora released the collaborative extended play Bang with Kazakh producer Imanbek. It spawned the lead single "Big" (2021) and the promotional single "Bang Bang" (2021), which entered the charts in several countries.

Albums

Extended plays

Singles

As lead artist

As featured artist

Promotional singles

Other charted songs

Songwriting credits

Notes

References

External links 

 
Discographies of British artists
Discographies of Albanian artists